The Department of Atomic Energy (DAE) (IAST: Paramāṇu Ūrjā Vibhāga) is a department with headquarters in Mumbai, Maharashtra, India. DAE was established in 1954 by a Presidential Order. DAE has been engaged in the development of nuclear power technology, applications of radiation technologies in the fields of agriculture, medicine, industry and basic research. DAE comprises five research centres, three industrial organisations, five public sector undertakings and three service organisations. It has under its aegis two boards for promoting and funding extramural research in nuclear and allied fields, mathematics and a national institute (deemed university). It also supports eight institutes of international repute engaged in research in basic sciences, astronomy, astrophysics, cancer research and education. It also has in its fold an educational society that provides educational facilities for children of DAE employees. The important programmes of the DAE are directed towards:

 Enhancing the share of nuclear power in the Power Sector by deployment of indigenous and other proven technologies, and to develop fast breeder reactors, as well as thorium-based reactors with associated fuel cycle facilities;
 Building and operating of research reactors for the production of radioisotopes, building other sources of radiation such as accelerators and lasers, and developing and deploying radiation technology applications in the fields of medicine, agriculture, industry and basic research.
 Developing advanced technologies such as accelerators, lasers, supercomputers, robotics, areas related to fusion research, strategic materials and instrumentation, and encouraging the transfer of technology to industry.
 Carrying out and supporting basic research in nuclear energy and related frontier areas of science; interaction with universities and academic institutions; support to research and development projects having a bearing on DAE’s programmes, and international cooperation in related advanced areas of research and contribution to national security.

Apex Board
 Atomic Energy Commission (AEC), Mumbai, Maharashtra

Regulatory Board and Organisation 
 Atomic Energy Regulatory Board (AERB), Mumbai, Maharashtra is given some regulation powers by AEC.

Research & Development Sector 
Bhabha Atomic Research Centre (BARC), Mumbai, following Research institutions affiliated to BARC
Atomic Minerals Directorate for Exploration and Research (AMD), Hyderabad
Indira Gandhi Centre for Atomic Research (IGCAR), Kalpakkam, Tamil Nadu
Raja Ramanna Centre for Advanced Technology (RRCAT), Indore
Variable Energy Cyclotron Centre (VECC), Kolkata
Global Centre for Nuclear Energy Partnership

Public Sector 
Electronics Corporation of India (ECIL), Hyderabad
Indian Rare Earths Limited (IREL), Mumbai
Uranium Corporation of India, Singhbhum
 Nuclear Power Corporation of India (NPCIL), Mumbai, Maharashtra
Bharatiya Nabhkiya Vidyut Nigam Limited (BHAVINI), Kalpakkam, Tamil Nadu

Industrial Organisations 
Heavy Water Board (HWB), Mumbai
Nuclear Fuel Complex (NFC), Hyderabad
Board of Radiation & Isotope Technology (BRIT), Mumbai

Service Organisations 
Directorate of Construction, Services and Estate Management (DAE) (DCSEM), Mumbai
Directorate of Purchase and Stores (DAE) (DPS), Mumbai
General Services Organisation (DAE) (GSO), Kalpakkam

Universities 
Homi Bhabha National Institute, Mumbai
Tata Institute of Fundamental Research, Mumbai
Tata Institute of Fundamental Research, Hyderabad

Aided Sector 
National Institute of Science Education and Research (NISER), Bhubaneswar
National Board for Higher Mathematics (NBHM), New Delhi
Atomic Energy Education Society (AEES), Mumbai
Tata Memorial Centre, Mumbai
Centre for Excellence in Basic Sciences
Saha Institute of Nuclear Physics (SINP), Kolkata
Institute of Physics, Bhubaneswar
Harish-Chandra Research Institute (HRI), Allahabad
Institute of Mathematical Sciences (IMSc), Chennai
Institute for Plasma Research, Gandhinagar

See also
Atomic Energy Commission of India
Atomic Energy Regulatory Board
Nuclear power in India
India and weapons of mass destruction

References

Ministry of Science and Technology (India)
Nuclear power in India
Government agencies for energy (India)
Organisations based in Mumbai
1954 establishments in Bombay State
Government agencies established in 1954